Glashütte [] is a town in Saxony, Germany, known as the birthplace of the German watchmaking industry and has a population of about 7,000. Historically, it was first mentioned in a document circa 1445. In January 2008, the former municipality Reinhardtsgrimma was merged into Glashütte.

Watches currently made in this location include:
A. Lange & Söhne
Bruno Söhnle Uhrenatelier Glashütte
C. H. Wolf
Glashütte Original
Mühle Glashütte
NOMOS Glashütte
 Wempe Chronometerwerke  
Tutima
Union Glashütte
Moritz Grossmann

Notable people
Ferdinand Adolph Lange (1815–1875), watchmaker, founder of A. Lange & Söhne, Member of Saxon Landtag 1857–1875, mayor of Glashütte 1848–1866
Arthur Burkhardt (1857–1918), engineer and manufacturer
Hans-Peter Kaul (1943–2014), judge, international lawyer and diplomat

References

External links

Glashütte - Hier lebt die Zeit (German)

 
Towns in the Ore Mountains